Thecla Schiphorst (born 1955) is a Canadian digital media artist and academic.

Work
Schiphorst was a founding developer of the dance and choreography software Lifeforms, alongside Tom Calvert. Using LifeForms, she collaborated over along period with the American dancer and choreographer Merce Cunningham.

She is also known for her interactive work Bodymaps: Artifacts of Touch, which near-field and touch sensors to allow the viewer to control a video image of the human form by touching the image.

Academic career
Schiphorst is the Associate Director and an Associate Professor of the School of Interactive Arts and Technology at Simon Fraser University.

Awards
In 1998, Schiphorst was a recipient of the Petro–Canada Award in New Media, administered by the Canada Council.

References

Canadian women artists
Canadian women academics
1955 births
Canadian installation artists
Living people
Academic staff of Simon Fraser University